Boynik Point (‘Nos Boynik’ \'nos 'boy-nik\) is the rounded rocky point on the southeast side of the entrance to Kozma Cove, forming the northeast extremity of Desolation Island in the entrance to Hero Bay, Livingston Island in Antarctica. The feature is named after the settlement of Boynik in Southern Bulgaria.

Location
British mapping in 1968, and Bulgarian in 2005, 2009 and 2017.

Maps
 L.L. Ivanov et al. Antarctica: Livingston Island and Greenwich Island, South Shetland Islands. Scale 1:100000 topographic map. Sofia: Antarctic Place-names Commission of Bulgaria, 2005.
 L.L. Ivanov. Antarctica: Livingston Island and Greenwich, Robert, Snow and Smith Islands. Scale 1:120000 topographic map.  Troyan: Manfred Wörner Foundation, 2009.
 Antarctic Digital Database (ADD). Scale 1:250000 topographic map of Antarctica. Scientific Committee on Antarctic Research (SCAR). Since 1993, regularly upgraded and updated

References
 Bulgarian Antarctic Gazetteer. Antarctic Place-names Commission. (details in Bulgarian, basic data in English)
 Boynik Point. SCAR Composite Gazetteer of Antarctica

External links
 Boynik Point. Copernix satellite image

Headlands of Livingston Island
Bulgaria and the Antarctic